Oattathoodhuvan-1854 is a 2015 Tamil-language historical period film, set in the year 1854. It was the first directorial venture of Ra.Mu. Chidambaram who had earlier penned the story for Newtonin Moondram Vidhi. Oattathoodhuvan-1854 was produced under the banner of the Kalorful Beta Movement.

Ra.Mu Chidambaram is a freelance journalist who has contributed to popular Tamil magazines. He has also written two Tamil novels under his pen name Rasin, and has almost fifteen years of experience as an assistant director in Tamil Cinema. He is an aspiring historian and worked on the script for this movie for nearly two years. The movie stars debutant actors, Ram Arun Castro, and Gowthami Chowdary in the lead roles.

Cast 
Ram Arun Castro as Madeshwaran
Gowthami Chowdhry
Nicolas Fuster
Jayaprakash
Kulothungan
Senthil
Pradeep
John Christopher

Production

The story is set in the year 1854 when India was under the British East India Company rule and was shot in the hills of Tamil Nadu.

Film festivals
The film was officially selected and screened in four prestigious international film festivals across India: the 21st Kolkata International Film Festival 2015; the 8th Bangalore International Film Festival 2016; the 14th Pune International Film Festival 2016; and the 13th Chennai International Film Festival 2016. The movie received positive reviews from critics and viewers during the screening at the festivals.

References

2015 films
2010s Tamil-language films